is a passenger railway station in located in the city of Wakayama, Wakayama Prefecture, Japan, operated by West Japan Railway Company (JR West).

Lines
Kii-Ogura Station is served by the Wakayama Line, and is located 77.6 kilometers from the terminus of the line at Ōji Station.

Station layout
The station consists of one side platform serving a single bi-directional track. The station is unattended.

Adjacent stations

|-

History
Kii-Ogura Station opened on July 15, 1938. With the privatization of the Japan National Railways (JNR) on April 1, 1987, the station came under the aegis of the West Japan Railway Company.

Passenger statistics
In fiscal 2019, the station was used by an average of 614 passengers daily (boarding passengers only).

Surrounding Area
Wakayama City Hall Ogura Branch
Wakayama Prefectural Wakayama High School
Wakayama City Ogura Elementary School
Wakayama Prefectural Industrial Technology Center
Wakayama Prefectural Wakayama Industrial Technology College

See also
List of railway stations in Japan

References

External links

 Kii-Ogura Station Official Site

Railway stations in Wakayama Prefecture
Railway stations in Japan opened in 1938
Wakayama (city)